John Lewis (6 October 1923 – 2002) was an English professional footballer who played in the Football League for Mansfield Town.

References

1923 births
2002 deaths
English footballers
Association football wing halves
English Football League players
West Bromwich Albion F.C. players
Mansfield Town F.C. players
Hereford United F.C. players